Hostel is a 2021 Russian teen drama film written and directed by Roman Vasyanov, adaptation of Alexei Ivanov's novel A Hostel on Spilled Blood (ru). It stars Gennady Vyrypaev, Irina Starshenbaum, Marina Vasilyeva, Nikita Yefremov, and Ilya Malanin.

It is unrelated to the 2005 American film series of the same name by Sony's subsidiary Screen Gems. The film premiered in June 2021 at the 24th Shanghai International Film Festival. The premiere took place online on September 26, 2021 at the online cinema Kion (ru) and KinoPoisk HD.

Plot 
The film is set in Sverdlovsk in 1984. A group of young people live in a hostel, and suddenly one student commits suicide, which radically changed the lives of friends.

Cast 
 Gennady Vyrypaev as Pavel Zabelin (Zabela), a student
 Irina Starshenbaum as Nelly Karavaeva, a female student
 Marina Vasilyeva as Sveta Leushina, a female student
 Nikita Yefremov as Vanya Simakov, a student
 Ilya Malanin as Igor Kaminsky, a student
 Yuliya Aug as Olga Botova, the commandant of the hostel

Rest of cast listed alphabetically

Production 
The film was directed by cinematographer Roman Vasyanov, who first appeared in a new capacity. According to him, he had long wanted to take part in the film adaptation of "Hostel on the Blood" (ru) as a cameraman, but due to the lack of a director he decided to take on this function. Vasyanov also became one of the authors of the script.

References

External links

2021 films
2020s Russian-language films
2020s teen drama films
Russian teen drama films
Films based on Russian novels
Films set in 1984
Films about rape
Columbia Pictures films
2021 drama films
2021 directorial debut films